The 1949 Swiss Grand Prix was a Grand Prix motor race which was held at Bremgarten on 3 July 1949. The race was won by Alberto Ascari driving a Ferrari 125. Ascari's team mate Luigi Villoresi was second and Raymond Sommer was third in a Talbot-Lago T26C. Giuseppe Farina set pole and fastest lap in his Maserati 4CLT/48 but retired with mechanical problems.

Entries

Classification

Qualifying

Race

References

Swiss Grand Prix
Grand Prix
Swiss